The Citadel of Warsaw (German: Die Warschauer Zitadelle) is a 1930 German historical drama film directed by Jacob Fleck and Luise Fleck and starring Victor Varconi, La Jana and Adam Brodzisz. The film's sets were designed by the art directors Willi Herrmann and Herbert O. Phillips. It was based on the play Tamten by Gabriela Zapolska, subsequently remade as the 1937 film The Citadel of Warsaw.

Synopsis
In Warsaw, then part of the Russian Empire, a student is arrested for revolutionary activities. He is released and strikes up a relationship with the niece of a senior figure in the repressive authorities who is being forced into an arranged marriage. In addition he encounters the seductive dancer Vera who is a spy for the Russians.

Cast
 Victor Varconi as Boris Gorski	
 La Jana as Vera Proskaja
 Adam Brodzisz as Steffan Bogdanski
 Ferdinand Hart as General Horn
 Louis Treumann as 	Oberst Korniloff, Chef der Geheimpolizei
 Harry Hardt as Oberleutnant Strelkoff
 Hilda Rosch as Sonja Lasotzka, Nichte General Horns
 Olga Limburg as 	Pensionsinhaberin

References

Bibliography 
 Giesen, Rolf. The Nosferatu Story: The Seminal Horror Film, Its Predecessors and Its Enduring Legacy. McFarland, 2019.
 Goble, Alan. The Complete Index to Literary Sources in Film. Walter de Gruyter, 1999.
 Klaus, Ulrich J. Deutsche Tonfilme: Jahrgang 1930. Klaus-Archiv, 1988.

External links 
 

1930 films
Films of the Weimar Republic
German historical films
1930s historical films
German drama films
1930 drama films
1930s German-language films
Films directed by Luise Fleck
Films directed by Jacob Fleck
Films set in Warsaw
German black-and-white films
1930s German films
German films based on plays